Applicative computing systems, or ACS are the systems of object calculi founded on combinatory logic and lambda calculus. 
The only essential notion which is under consideration in these systems is the representation of object. In combinatory logic the only metaoperator is application in a sense of applying one object to other. In lambda calculus two metaoperators are used: application – the same as in combinatory logic, and functional abstraction which binds the only variable in one object.

Features 

The objects generated in these systems are the functional entities with the following features:

 the number of argument places, or object arity is not fixed but is enabling step by step in interoperations with other objects;
 in a process of generating the compound object one of its counterparts—function—is applied to other one—argument—but in other contexts they can change their roles, i.e. functions and arguments are considered on the equal rights;
 the self-applying of functions is allowed, i.e. any object can be applied to itself.

ACS give a sound ground for applicative approach to programming.

Research challenge 

Applicative computing systems' lack of storage and history sensitivity is the basic reason they have not provided a foundation for computer design. Moreover, most applicative systems employ the substitution operation of the lambda calculus as their basic operation. This operation is one of virtually unlimited power, but its complete and efficient realization presents great difficulties to the machine designer.

See also 

 Applicative programming language
 Categorical abstract machine
 Combinatory logic
 Functional programming
 Lambda calculus

References

Further reading 

 [This volume reflects the research program and philosophy of H. Curry, one of the founders of computational models and the deductive framework for reasoning in terms of objects.]

 
Models of computation
Combinatory logic
Lambda calculus